Anthony Raymond Ceresko (1942–2005) was an Old Testament scholar.

History 
Ceresko was born in Detroit, Michigan, USA, on 20 August 1942. After completing studies at the local Salesian High School in Detroit, Ceresko entered the Oblates of St. Francis de Sales in Childs, Maryland and was professed on 21 August 1962.

Studies 
He studied at the Niagara University, Lewiston, New York, and graduated in 1967. Ceresko was later sent to The Catholic University of America, Washington, D.C., in 1970 where he studied Bachelor of Sacred Theology (STB) and Licentiate of Sacred Theology (STL).

Ceresko obtained a doctorate from the Pontifical Biblical Institute. His thesis was Job 29:31 in the light of Northwest Semitic - A Translation and Philological Commentary.

Writings
 Job 29:31 in the light of Northwest Semitic - A Translation and Philological Commentary
 Introduction to the Old Testament: a Liberation Perspective
 Introduction to Old Testament Wisdom - A Spirituality for Liberation

Teacher
Ceresko first taught at the SS. Cyril and Methodius Seminary in Orchard Lake, Michigan. He later moved to Canada and was Professor of Scripture at University of St. Michael's College in Toronto.

In 1991, Ceresko moved to India and was Professor of Old Testament at  St. Peter's Pontifical Seminary in Bengaluru. In 1999, Ceresko volunteered to teach in the Divine Word Seminary in Tagaytay, Philippines.

Scholarship
Along with Thomas P. Wahl, Ceresko co-edited the notes on Zephaniah, Nahum, Habakkuk in the second edition of the New Jerome Biblical Commentary, and wrote the notes on Jonah.

Ceresko's other journal articles include:
 "The Function of 'Order' (Sedeq) and 'Creation' in the Book of Proverbs with Some Implications for Today".
 "The Rhetorical Strategy of the Fourth Servant Song (Isaiah 52:13-53:12): Poetry and the Exodus-New Exodus"
 "The Abcs of Wisdom in Psalm xxxiv"
 "A Note on Psalm 63: A Psalm of Vigil"
 "A Poetic Analysis of Ps 105, with Attention to Its Use of Irony"
 "Prayers for Times of Distress"
 "Psalm 121: A Prayer of a Warrior?"
 "Psalm 149: Poetry, Themes (Exodus and Conquest), and Social Function"
 "The Sage in the Psalms."  The Sage in Israel and the Ancient near East"
 "The Function of Chiasmus in Hebrew Poetry"
 "St. Francis de Sales - Spiritual Directory for a New Century: Re-interpreting the Direction of Intention"
 "To reward them afterwards - Eschatology and St. Francis de Sales - Direction of Intention or Right Intending of Deeds"

References
Notes

Further reading
 

Old Testament scholars
20th-century American Roman Catholic theologians
Catholic University of America alumni
Niagara University alumni
2005 deaths
1942 births
Writers from Detroit
Pontifical Biblical Institute alumni
Academic staff of the Senate of Serampore College (University)
20th-century American Roman Catholic priests